"Your Own Special Way" is a song by the English progressive rock band Genesis. The song was written by the band's bassist and guitarist Mike Rutherford. Released (in edited form) as the first and only single from their eighth studio album Wind & Wuthering, it became the band's first song to chart on the Billboard Hot 100, peaking at number 62. The laid-back nature of the song stood in stark contrast to much of the band's earlier material and foreshadowed many of the band's later hits, such as the following album's "Follow You Follow Me".

"Your Own Special Way" was the last single Genesis would release with guitarist Steve Hackett until the band's 1999 re-recording of "The Carpet Crawlers" (which also included original lead vocalist Peter Gabriel).

Background

"Your Own Special Way" was written solely by Rutherford and is the third track on Wind & Wuthering. It was written and performed in an open tuning. The main body of the song was merged with an unrelated piece of music (performed on a Fender Rhodes electric piano) to create the finalized song.

In keeping with the theme of literary references common throughout the album, the lyrics reference the title of Christina Rossetti's poem "Who Has Seen the Wind?".

Release
"Your Own Special Way" was released as a single on 18 February 1977 (backed with the non-album track "It's Yourself"). It became Genesis' greatest success in the US at the time of its release, peaking at number 62 and becoming their first song to chart in that country. The song was also the band's second to reach the chart in their native UK (after the number 21 hit "I Know What I Like (In Your Wardrobe)", peaking at number 43. The success of the song, alongside Genesis' increasing profile, made Wind & Wuthering their most successful album in the US at the time, making it to number 26 and becoming their first top 30 album.

Record World said that it "should assure some degree of single success" and that "Phil Collins' vocal could set the spark."

The song has been included on numerous Genesis compilations, including Turn it on Again: The Hits (The Tour Edition) and Platinum Collection.

Track listing

Charts

References

1977 singles
Genesis (band) songs